Kalateh-ye Sohrab (also Romanized as Kalāteh-ye Sohrāb and Kalāteh Sohrāb) is a village in Garmkhan Rural District, Garmkhan District, Bojnord County, North Khorasan Province, Iran. At the 2006 census, its population was 494, in 125 families.

References 

Populated places in Bojnord County